Constance Catharina Margarethe (Stanny) van Baer (born 1942) is a Dutch model and beauty queen who won Miss International 1961.

References

External links
 Stanny van Baer dancing at a Jewish festival in Amsterdam, 1957/1958. Photo by Leonard Freed in de Volkskrant, 2 Nov. 2015
 Two other photos of van Baer by Leonard Freed (scroll down to the section "Jewish Beauty Queen")
 "Beautiful women, songs at the Big Dome" (advertisement for the 1962 Christmas Cavalcade in Quezon City)
 Chris Peck: 'Life’s Threads Bind Us All At Christmas'. In: The Spokesman Review, 21 Dec. 1997

1942 births
Living people
Dutch female models
Miss International 1961 delegates
Miss International winners
Dutch beauty pageant winners
Dutch Jews